Polycarpaea hayoides is a species of plant in the family Caryophyllaceae. It is endemic to Yemen.  Its natural habitats are subtropical or tropical dry shrubland and plantations .

References

Endemic flora of Socotra
hayoides
Least concern plants
Taxonomy articles created by Polbot